Corthylus columbianus, also known as the chestnut timber worm or the Columbian timber beetle, is a beetle of the family Curculionidae.

References

External links 

Beetles described in 1894
Scolytinae